The siege of Gongenyama (権現山の戦い) occurred in 1510 during the Sengoku period of Japan's history. The daimyō Uesugi Tomoyoshi (上杉朝良; died 1518) had a retainer Ueda Masamori (上田政盛) who rebelled against him and laid siege to his castle of Gongenyama. Masamori was defeated.

References

Gongenyama 1510
Conflicts in 1510
Yokohama
1510 in Asia